"The Echo of Your Footsteps" is a country music song written by Jenny Lou Carson and sung by Eddy Arnold, billed as "Eddy Arnold, The Tennessee Plowboy and His Guitar". It was released in 1949 on the RCA Victor label (catalog no. 21-0051-A). The "B" side was "One Kiss Too Many".

It debuted on Billboard magazine's folk chart on May 21, 1949, peaked at No. 2 on the best seller chart (No. 3 juke box), and remained on the charts for 19 weeks. On Billboards year-end folk chart, it ranked No. 11 among the best selling record of 1949.

See also
 Billboard Top Folk Records of 1949

References

Eddy Arnold songs
1949 songs
Songs written by Jenny Lou Carson